August Schwendenwein von Lanauberg (1 December 1817, Vienna - 3 November 1885, Vienna) was an Austrian architect who built several Viennese palaces.

Life and works 
He came from a poor family, that worked hard to put him through school. He was awarded the Academy's Gundel-Prize for excellence in 1837. After graduating, a scholarship enabled him to continue his studies in Munich and take several study trips.

Their firm became prominent in the field of rental and commercial buildings, but they specialized in upper-class residential architecture. Romano was essentially the company's salesman, so he became familiar throughout Viennese society, whereas Schwendenwein was largely unknown, although the designs were predominantly his. Most of their buildings are in Vienna, but they worked throughout the Austro-Hungarian Empire.

From 1866, he was a member of the Academy and, in 1870, was awarded the Order of the Iron Crown, which conferred a title of nobility. In 1876, he joined the Vienna Künstlerhaus. 

When his wife died in an accident in 1872, he withdrew from the construction business, but continued to participate on committees, commissions, and other official bodies. He used much of his fortune to support charitable causes.

A street in Vienna's Währing district was named after him in 1894.

Sources

External links 

 
 August Schwendenwein von Lanauberg @ the Wien Geschichte Wik

1817 births
1885 deaths
Austrian architects
Academy of Fine Arts Vienna alumni
Architects from Vienna